RCAF Station Mossbank opened 28 Oct 1940 and was home to No. 2 Bombing and Gunnery School. The station was a Second World War, British Commonwealth Air Training Plan training facility located near Mossbank,  Saskatchewan, Canada.  It was similar to the gunnery school at Dafoe, Saskatchewan. The proximity to a lake (Old Wives Lake) was important since the lake could be used for bombing and gunnery practice.  Aircraft used include the Westland Lysander, Bristol Bolingbroke, Avro Anson, and Fairey Battle. The school closed 15 December 1944, after having graduated 2,539 air bombers and 3,702 air gunners.

Aerodrome
Three runways were listed as follows:

RCAF Mossbank today

Today the airfield is abandoned with only the gunnery backstop, hangar pads and weedy, broken runways to see. It is used as a "practice airshow airport" for 431 Air Demonstration Squadron (The Snowbirds) as it is conveniently located in their training area CYR 303 (restricted).

On December 10, 2004, a collision between two CT-114 Tutor jets from the Snowbirds occurred during training over Mossbank.  The collision led to the death of Capt. Miles Selby.  Capt. Chuck Mallett survived the collision and subsequent crash after he was "thrown out" as the airplane disintegrated.

Selby Road on the eastern edge of the airbase has been dedicated in the memory of Capt. Miles Selby.

A cairn is located at the entrance of the Mossbank Golf Course, which borders the old base.  The cairn is dedicated to all the people that have served at Mossbank.

Turvey Centre, located near IPSCO (Interprovincial Steel and Pipe Corporation)(new name is Evares as of 2008) in Regina, was originally an aircraft hangar from Mossbank. The building, which now has a stage and second floor balcony, is now used for events such as wedding receptions, hobby shows, swap meets and other activities.

References

 Town of Mossbank
 COPA places to fly
 Bruce Forsyth's Canadian Military History Page

Military history of Saskatchewan
Military airbases in Saskatchewan
Defunct airports in Saskatchewan
Mossbank
Mossbank
Canadian Forces bases in Canada (closed)